Montrose is a home rule municipality that is the county seat and the most populous municipality of Montrose County, Colorado, United States.  The city population was 20,291 at the 2020 census, within a total area of 18.5 square miles. The main road that leads in and out of Montrose is U.S. Highway 50. The town is located in western Colorado, in the Uncompahgre Valley, and is an economic, labor, and transportation waypoint for the surrounding recreation industry.

In 2022, Montrose was ranked in the top-25 of the nation's most dynamic micropolitan statistical areas by think tank Heartland Forward largely due to its outdoor recreation access.

History
Montrose was incorporated on May 2, 1882, and named after Sir Walter Scott's novel A Legend of Montrose by Oliver D. "Pappy" Loutzenhizer and Joseph Selig. The Denver & Rio Grande railroad was built west toward Grand Junction and reached Montrose later in 1882, and the town became an important regional shipping center. A branch railroad line served the mineral-rich San Juan Mountains to the south.

In 1909, the U.S. government completed construction of the Gunnison Tunnel, located east of Montrose.  It provided irrigation water from the Gunnison River in the Black Canyon to the Uncompahgre Valley, helping turn Montrose into an agricultural hub. The Uncompahgre Project is one of the oldest of those in the area by the U.S. Bureau of Reclamation.

Early in the area's history, prehistoric people lived in the vicinity who created rock art at the Shavano Valley Rock Art Site from 1000 BC or earlier; their descendants continued this practice until about AD 1881. These petroglyphs recorded cultural events and were a means of artistic expression. The site is listed on the Colorado State Register of Historic Properties and the National Register of Historic Places.

Montrose is the birthplace of American screenwriter and novelist Dalton Trumbo, who scripted films including Roman Holiday, Exodus, Spartacus and Thirty Seconds Over Tokyo.

Geography

Montrose is at the south end of the Uncompahgre valley and is built on the Uncompahgre River, which runs to the north, where 60 miles further its waters will join the Colorado River. It is surrounded by, to the north, the widening Uncompahgre Valley and the Grand Mesa, to the east, the Black Canyon of the Gunnison National Park, to the south, the San Juan Mountains, and to the west the Uncompahgre Plateau. The valley is arid, and is only arable due to the water from the Gunnison Tunnel and Ridgway Reservoir.

Climate
Montrose features a semi-arid Continental climate zone. The town sits on high grasslands in the Uncompahgre Valley of Western Colorado. Snowfall occurs during the winter but is usually short-lived due to the high altitude and abundant sunshine.

Demographics

2020 census
As of the 2020 census, there were 20,291 people and 8,175 households residing in the city. The average median age was 45.2 years and the average work commute time was 15.4 minutes, nearly 40% lower than the State of Colorado. In the city, the population was spread out, with 21.0% under the age of 18, 7.5% from 18 to 24, 21.3% from 25 to 44, 25.0% from 45 to 64, and 25.3% who were 65 years of age or older. For every 100 females, there were 86.4 males.

The racial makeup of the city was 78.44% White, 0.57% African American, 1.36% American Indian or Alaskan Native, 1.15% Asian, 0.09% Pacific Islander, 8.68% from other races, and 9.71% from two or more races. Hispanic or Latino of any race were 4,491 people or 22.13% of the population.

There were a total of 8,175 households, with an average family size of 2.90. 57.8% are married, 21.4% never married, 12.6% divorced, 1.2% separated, and 7.0% widowed. The homeownership rate was 68.8%, slightly higher than the Colorado average. The median gross rent was $936 per month, or nearly 30% lower than the State of Colorado and nearly 36% lower than neighboring Telluride.

The median income for a household in the city was $52,534, a 56% increase from the 2010 US Census. The median income for a family was $68,801. About 16.8% of the population were below the poverty line, including 24.8% of those under age 18 and 9.9% of those age 65 or over.

Approximately 27.5% of the population in the city has a Bachelor's Degree or higher, with 27.3% reporting a high school or equivalent degree, and 26.7% with some college but no degree. About 77.7% of those eligible for school enrollment between kindergarten and 12th grade are enrolled, much higher than the Colorado average of 66.5%.

Economy
Due to its relative affordability and proximity to many world-class outdoor recreation activities, Montrose is known as a manufacturing hub for outdoor products. Fly-fishing companies Ross Reels, Abel, and Airflo are headquartered in the city. Additionally, Scott Fly Rods relocated to Montrose from Telluride in 1993. Gordon Composites, maker of nearly 90 percent of the high-performance laminate material used in the bow-hunting industry, is located in Montrose. Colorado Yurt Company, maker of handcrafted yurts, tipis, and rugged canvas wall tents, is also located in Montrose.

The Montrose City Council is actively recruiting outdoor recreation businesses to boost the local economy and create primary jobs. In addition, the City is planning major river corridor construction and restoration with the company, which it plans to use to attract more industry, increase outdoor recreation, and promote tourism.

Tourist and recreation opportunities are important to the regional economy. Montrose is a gateway to the Black Canyon of the Gunnison National Park to the east of town. In the winter, it is a transportation hub for ski areas of the San Juan Mountains to the south.

In November 2017, the City approved a $10 million fund for public infrastructure improvements within the Colorado Outdoors development, and was the recipient of a $2 million grant for a new trail system. The GOCO grant was the largest single grant awarded to the City of Montrose in its history, and connects the newly built, $30 million Montrose Recreation Center to the project, safely under-passing both major highways within the City.

The Montrose Urban Renewal Authority (MURA), the taxing entity in partnership with the Colorado Outdoors project, was the recipient of 2019 Governors Award from Downtown Colorado, Inc for Best Urban Renewal project.

In November 2019, Governor Jared Polis visited Montrose and Mayfly to unveil his Rural Economic Blueprint which focuses heavily on expanding rural access to broadband services and investing in rural economic development.

Russell Stover Candies announced in January 2020 that it would be closing its Montrose plant in the spring of 2021, eliminating 400 jobs and offering employees to relocate to plants in Kansas and Texas. The plant is listed as a "primary employer" for the city on its Economic Development Corporation website.

In October 2020, the City of Montrose announced a multi-year, multi-million dollar river restoration project along the Uncompahgre River, including a $785,00 grant from the Colorado Water Conservation Board.

In the fall of 2022, Montrose was ranked in the top-25 of the nation's most dynamic micropolitan statistical areas by think tank Heartland Forward. This is largely based on the City's access to outdoor recreation, with the study citing the City's mix of broadband connectivity and access to the outdoors which became a respite from the difficulties of pandemic-era city life.

Infrastructure

Fiber optic internet 
The City of Montrose has several miles of fiber optic internet service installed and boasts 1 gigabyte internet speeds throughout the community.

Transportation
Montrose Regional Airport serves the Montrose area with regional service to Denver. As the nearest major airport to the Telluride Ski Area, Montrose sees heavy seasonal service. Montrose has a city-run bus service. Its three lines run only during weekdays. There are three lines that  Montrose is part of Colorado's Bustang network. It is along the Durango-Grand Junction Outrider line.

Major highways
 US 50 runs east-west, crossing 12 states. It links Sacramento, California with Ocean City, Maryland. In Colorado, it connects Montrose to Grand Junction, Gunnison and Pueblo.
 US 550 comes all the way from Bernalillo, New Mexico (just north of Albuquerque), via Durango and Ridgway, reaching its end at the corner of Townsend Avenue and Main Street, in Montrose.

In popular culture

Movies 
Several Western films have connections to Montrose. The original version of True Grit (1969 Film) starring John Wayne was filmed in Montrose and the surrounding region. Additionally, several scenes from motion pictures How the West Was Won (1962 Film) and The Sheepman (1958 Film) were shot in Montrose.

Television 
The television series, Then Came Bronson starring Michael Parks had the episodes "Old Tigers Never Die; They Just Run Away" and "Mating Dance for Tender Grass" filmed in and around Montrose. In the A&E network reality show, Dog the Bounty Hunter, Montrose is featured in four episodes. The MTV reality show Teen Mom: Young and Pregnant's has several episodes filmed in Montrose, where living in a small town was a common talking point in the series.

In the AMC drama series, Better Call Saul, Saul Goodman is incarcerated in ADX Montrose, a fictional maximum security prison based in Montrose, serving an 86-year sentence for his involvement in the events of Breaking Bad and related crimes. ADX Montrose is referred to as the “Alcatraz of the Rockies” and is based on ADX Florence.

Other 
The 2011 video game Homefront is set mostly in Montrose. The game tells the story of a resistance movement fighting shortly against the military occupation of the Western United States by North Korea.

See also

Outline of Colorado
Index of Colorado-related articles
State of Colorado
Colorado cities and towns
Colorado municipalities
Colorado counties
Montrose County, Colorado
List of statistical areas in Colorado
Montrose, CO Micropolitan Statistical Area
Black Canyon of the Gunnison National Park
Colorado Mesa University
Montrose Botanic Gardens
Old Spanish National Historic Trail
Ute Indian Museum

References

External links
 

City of Montrose official website
VisitMontrose official visitor website

 
Cities in Montrose County, Colorado
County seats in Colorado
Colorado Western Slope
Populated places established in 1882
1882 establishments in Colorado
Cities in Colorado